Cameroon made its Paralympic Games début at the 2012 Summer Paralympics in London, sending a single representative (Conrat Atangana) to compete in powerlifting.

Medal tables

Medals by Summer Games

Full results for Cameroon at the Paralympics

See also
 Cameroon at the Olympics

References